The Otter River is a river in Massachusetts that flows approximately 10 miles and is a major tributary of the Millers River which in turn is a tributary of the Connecticut River. The Otter River enters the Millers River in Winchendon in Otter River State Forest.

External links

Rivers of Massachusetts
Rivers of Worcester County, Massachusetts
Tributaries of the Connecticut River